A director's viewfinder or director's finder is a viewfinder used by film directors and cinematographers to set the framing of a motion picture or movie camera. There are three types of director's viewfinders.

Traditional

The most traditional director's viewfinder looks like a short telescope, can be held easily in one hand and is often seen hanging from a lanyard on the director's neck. Sometimes called a "Tewe" in Europe (after a German company that manufactured them). The functionality of these devices is limited in that they only assist in observing the field of view of the lenses that will be used on the motion picture camera but not the characteristics of that lens. This type of viewfinder allows the user to select multiple camera formats, aspect ratios and focal lengths within a specific range.

Early blimped motion picture film cameras like the Mitchell Camera BNCR were not reflex finder cameras. Instead a viewfinder similar in concept to the Alan Gordon Mark Vb bolted to the side of the camera was employed by the camera operator to frame a shot when filming. In between takes, the camera could be "racked over" to allow viewing of the actual taking lens.

Lens finder
The second type, also called a  director's viewfinder but sometimes referred to as a lens finder, is a larger device than the traditional viewfinder and employs the lenses that are intended to be used on the motion picture camera. These allow both the director and cinematographer to not only observe the field of view but also the character of the lens in terms of depth of field, optical aberration and general subjective "feel". These devices are still common on film sets, allowing shots to be framed without having to use the motion picture camera as a viewing device. Lens finders are camera format specific and require the lenses that will be used in production. They can only be viewed by one individual at a time. 

Variations exist for different lens mounting systems, most typically Arri PL, Arri LPL, Panavision PV mount, Panavision SP70 and Mitchell BNCR mounts. Other additions such as the addition of video assist have been made available on models such as the Kish Optics Ultimate Director's Viewfinder.

Smart phone application

In 2008 a third type of viewfinder was introduced to the motion picture industry: software-based viewfinders that use either iPhone, iPad or Android devices to replicate the functions of the traditional viewfinder. These software solutions enable an array of additional functionality such as the ability to take and store images with GPS tags, create frame-lines to define a specific Aspect ratio (image), create overlays and record information relevant in planning shoots. With iPads and digital media taking the place of traditional storyboards and printed script breakdowns, digital viewfinder applications can also capture video sequences, allowing for a much higher level of detail in pre-production. They are also considerably cheaper than the first two physical devices, giving greater flexibility and functionality of the traditional viewfinder but lacking the critical assessment characteristics of the lens finder.

References

Photography equipment